The Georgiyevsk constituency (No.68) is a Russian legislative constituency in Stavropol Krai. The constituency covers northern and eastern Stavropol Krai.

Members elected

Election results

1993

|-
! colspan=2 style="background-color:#E9E9E9;text-align:left;vertical-align:top;" |Candidate
! style="background-color:#E9E9E9;text-align:left;vertical-align:top;" |Party
! style="background-color:#E9E9E9;text-align:right;" |Votes
! style="background-color:#E9E9E9;text-align:right;" |%
|-
|style="background-color:"|
|align=left|Viktor Borodin
|align=left|Independent
|
|21.82%
|-
|style="background-color:"|
|align=left|Viktor Savitsky
|align=left|Independent
| -
|20.00%
|-
| colspan="5" style="background-color:#E9E9E9;"|
|- style="font-weight:bold"
| colspan="3" style="text-align:left;" | Total
| 
| 100%
|-
| colspan="5" style="background-color:#E9E9E9;"|
|- style="font-weight:bold"
| colspan="4" |Source:
|
|}

1995

|-
! colspan=2 style="background-color:#E9E9E9;text-align:left;vertical-align:top;" |Candidate
! style="background-color:#E9E9E9;text-align:left;vertical-align:top;" |Party
! style="background-color:#E9E9E9;text-align:right;" |Votes
! style="background-color:#E9E9E9;text-align:right;" |%
|-
|style="background-color:"|
|align=left|Nikolay Manzhosov
|align=left|Communist Party
|
|28.51%
|-
|style="background-color:"|
|align=left|Viktor Savitsky
|align=left|Independent
|
|14.28%
|-
|style="background-color:"|
|align=left|Vera Gamzatova
|align=left|Independent
|
|13.43%
|-
|style="background-color:"|
|align=left|Viktor Borodin (incumbent)
|align=left|Independent
|
|7.90%
|-
|style="background-color:"|
|align=left|Ivan Kostyukov
|align=left|Agrarian Party
|
|7.77%
|-
|style="background-color:"|
|align=left|Viktor Novoseltsev
|align=left|Liberal Democratic Party
|
|7.52%
|-
|style="background-color:"|
|align=left|Stanislav Pozdnyakov
|align=left|Independent
|
|6.06%
|-
|style="background-color:#2C299A"|
|align=left|Alevtina Lavrikova
|align=left|Congress of Russian Communities
|
|2.69%
|-
|style="background-color:"|
|align=left|Mikhail Korobeynikov
|align=left|Power to the People
|
|2.51%
|-
|style="background-color:#1C1A0D"|
|align=left|Mikhail Zdvizhnikov
|align=left|Forward, Russia!
|
|1.29%
|-
|style="background-color:#000000"|
|colspan=2 |against all
|
|6.02%
|-
| colspan="5" style="background-color:#E9E9E9;"|
|- style="font-weight:bold"
| colspan="3" style="text-align:left;" | Total
| 
| 100%
|-
| colspan="5" style="background-color:#E9E9E9;"|
|- style="font-weight:bold"
| colspan="4" |Source:
|
|}

1997

|-
! colspan=2 style="background-color:#E9E9E9;text-align:left;vertical-align:top;" |Candidate
! style="background-color:#E9E9E9;text-align:left;vertical-align:top;" |Party
! style="background-color:#E9E9E9;text-align:right;" |Votes
! style="background-color:#E9E9E9;text-align:right;" |%
|-
|style="background-color:"|
|align=left|Ivan Meshcherin
|align=left|Communist Party
|-
|43.99%
|-
| colspan="5" style="background-color:#E9E9E9;"|
|- style="font-weight:bold"
| colspan="3" style="text-align:left;" | Total
| -
| 100%
|-
| colspan="5" style="background-color:#E9E9E9;"|
|- style="font-weight:bold"
| colspan="4" |Source:
|
|}

1999

|-
! colspan=2 style="background-color:#E9E9E9;text-align:left;vertical-align:top;" |Candidate
! style="background-color:#E9E9E9;text-align:left;vertical-align:top;" |Party
! style="background-color:#E9E9E9;text-align:right;" |Votes
! style="background-color:#E9E9E9;text-align:right;" |%
|-
|style="background-color:"|
|align=left|Ivan Meshcherin (incumbent)
|align=left|Communist Party
|
|25.02%
|-
|style="background-color:"|
|align=left|Valery Ochirov
|align=left|Independent
|
|15.17%
|-
|style="background-color:#3B9EDF"|
|align=left|Viktor Ponomarenko
|align=left|Fatherland – All Russia
|
|12.46%
|-
|style="background-color:"|
|align=left|Oleg Petrovsky
|align=left|Our Home – Russia
|
|7.46%
|-
|style="background-color:#FCCA19"|
|align=left|Vasily Belchenko
|align=left|Congress of Russian Communities-Yury Boldyrev Movement
|
|6.43%
|-
|style="background-color:"|
|align=left|Olga Kovaleva
|align=left|Yabloko
|
|4.62%
|-
|style="background-color:"|
|align=left|Natalya Vishnyakova
|align=left|Independent
|
|3.77%
|-
|style="background-color:#020266"|
|align=left|Olga Bazhina
|align=left|Russian Socialist Party
|
|2.84%
|-
|style="background-color:"|
|align=left|Igor Steklyannikov
|align=left|Independent
|
|2.75%
|-
|style="background-color:#F1043D"|
|align=left|Leonid Mayorov
|align=left|Socialist Party
|
|2.71%
|-
|style="background-color:"|
|align=left|Sergey Vartanov
|align=left|Liberal Democratic Party
|
|2.37%
|-
|style="background-color:"|
|align=left|Boris Mullaliyev
|align=left|Independent
|
|2.29%
|-
|style="background-color:#C21022"|
|align=left|Andrey Toporkov
|align=left|Party of Pensioners
|
|1.38%
|-
|style="background-color:#C62B55"|
|align=left|Andrey Shchelokov
|align=left|Peace, Labour, May
|
|0.56%
|-
|style="background-color:#084284"|
|align=left|Vladimir Fedotov
|align=left|Spiritual Heritage
|
|0.42%
|-
|style="background-color:#000000"|
|colspan=2 |against all
|
|7.53%
|-
| colspan="5" style="background-color:#E9E9E9;"|
|- style="font-weight:bold"
| colspan="3" style="text-align:left;" | Total
| 
| 100%
|-
| colspan="5" style="background-color:#E9E9E9;"|
|- style="font-weight:bold"
| colspan="4" |Source:
|
|}

2003

|-
! colspan=2 style="background-color:#E9E9E9;text-align:left;vertical-align:top;" |Candidate
! style="background-color:#E9E9E9;text-align:left;vertical-align:top;" |Party
! style="background-color:#E9E9E9;text-align:right;" |Votes
! style="background-color:#E9E9E9;text-align:right;" |%
|-
|style="background-color:"|
|align=left|Aleksandr Ishchenko
|align=left|Independent
|
|29.86%
|-
|style="background-color:"|
|align=left|Yury Vasilyev
|align=left|United Russia
|
|23.29%
|-
|style="background-color:"|
|align=left|Ivan Meshcherin (incumbent)
|align=left|Communist Party
|
|7.02%
|-
|style="background-color:"|
|align=left|Gennady Aboneyev
|align=left|Independent
|
|5.22%
|-
|style="background-color:"|
|align=left|Nikolay Lyashenko
|align=left|Social Democratic Party
|
|3.71%
|-
|style="background-color:"|
|align=left|Viktor Gubanov
|align=left|Independent
|
|3.55%
|-
|style="background-color:#00A1FF"|
|align=left|Georgy Pryakhin
|align=left|Party of Russia's Rebirth-Russian Party of Life
|
|2.94%
|-
|style="background-color:"|
|align=left|Viktor Boroday
|align=left|Independent
|
|2.90%
|-
|style="background-color:"|
|align=left|Olga Kovaleva
|align=left|Yabloko
|
|2.75%
|-
|style="background-color:"|
|align=left|Viktor Zhukov
|align=left|Liberal Democratic Party
|
|2.43%
|-
|style="background-color:"|
|align=left|Nikolay Gubsky
|align=left|Agrarian Party
|
|2.16%
|-
|style="background-color:#FFD700"|
|align=left|Yury Vlasov
|align=left|People's Party
|
|1.60%
|-
|style="background-color:#408080"|
|align=left|Sergey Ponomarenko
|align=left|For a Holy Russia
|
|0.83%
|-
|style="background-color:"|
|align=left|Aleksandr Pluttsov
|align=left|Independent
|
|0.69%
|-
|style="background-color:#164C8C"|
|align=left|Yury Chuguyevsky
|align=left|United Russian Party Rus'
|
|0.38%
|-
|style="background-color:#000000"|
|colspan=2 |against all
|
|8.70%
|-
| colspan="5" style="background-color:#E9E9E9;"|
|- style="font-weight:bold"
| colspan="3" style="text-align:left;" | Total
| 
| 100%
|-
| colspan="5" style="background-color:#E9E9E9;"|
|- style="font-weight:bold"
| colspan="4" |Source:
|
|}

2016

|-
! colspan=2 style="background-color:#E9E9E9;text-align:left;vertical-align:top;" |Candidate
! style="background-color:#E9E9E9;text-align:left;vertical-align:top;" |Party
! style="background-color:#E9E9E9;text-align:right;" |Votes
! style="background-color:#E9E9E9;text-align:right;" |%
|-
|style="background-color: " |
|align=left|Yelena Bondarenko
|align=left|United Russia
|
|57.75%
|-
|style="background-color:"|
|align=left|Viktor Lozovoy
|align=left|Communist Party
|
|13.98%
|-
|style="background-color:"|
|align=left|Aleksandr Chernogorov
|align=left|Liberal Democratic Party
|
|8.56%
|-
|style="background-color:"|
|align=left|Yevgeny Bolkhovitin
|align=left|A Just Russia
|
|5.22%
|-
|style="background:"| 
|align=left|Nikolay Lyashenko
|align=left|Yabloko
|
|2.72%
|-
|style="background:"| 
|align=left|Alina Chikatuyeva
|align=left|Communists of Russia
|
|2.09%
|-
|style="background-color:"|
|align=left|Georgy Dzasokhov
|align=left|The Greens
|
|1.65%
|-
|style="background-color: "|
|align=left|Denis Slinko
|align=left|Party of Growth
|
|1.50%
|-
|style="background-color:"|
|align=left|Mikhail Seredenko
|align=left|Rodina
|
|1.23%
|-
| colspan="5" style="background-color:#E9E9E9;"|
|- style="font-weight:bold"
| colspan="3" style="text-align:left;" | Total
| 
| 100%
|-
| colspan="5" style="background-color:#E9E9E9;"|
|- style="font-weight:bold"
| colspan="4" |Source:
|
|}

2021

|-
! colspan=2 style="background-color:#E9E9E9;text-align:left;vertical-align:top;" |Candidate
! style="background-color:#E9E9E9;text-align:left;vertical-align:top;" |Party
! style="background-color:#E9E9E9;text-align:right;" |Votes
! style="background-color:#E9E9E9;text-align:right;" |%
|-
|style="background-color: " |
|align=left|Yelena Bondarenko (incumbent)
|align=left|United Russia
|
|52.76%
|-
|style="background-color:"|
|align=left|Viktor Lozovoy
|align=left|Communist Party
|
|12.75%
|-
|style="background:"| 
|align=left|Tatyana Bikeyeva
|align=left|Communists of Russia
|
|8.65%
|-
|style="background-color: " |
|align=left|Dmitry Bazhenov
|align=left|New People
|
|7.19%
|-
|style="background-color:"|
|align=left|Aleksey Voytov
|align=left|A Just Russia — For Truth
|
|5.35%
|-
|style="background-color:"|
|align=left|Maksim Zaytsev
|align=left|Liberal Democratic Party
|
|4.77%
|-
|style="background-color: "|
|align=left|Anatoly Chernov
|align=left|Party of Pensioners
|
|3.96%
|-
| colspan="5" style="background-color:#E9E9E9;"|
|- style="font-weight:bold"
| colspan="3" style="text-align:left;" | Total
| 
| 100%
|-
| colspan="5" style="background-color:#E9E9E9;"|
|- style="font-weight:bold"
| colspan="4" |Source:
|
|}

Notes

References

Russian legislative constituencies
Politics of Stavropol Krai